The 2007 Colchester Borough Council election took place on 3 May 2007 to elect members of Colchester Borough Council in Essex, England. One third of the council was up for election and the council stayed under no overall control.

After the election, the composition of the council was
Conservative 30
Liberal Democrats 21
Labour 6
Independent 3

Campaign
Before the election the Conservatives had 30 of the 60 seats on the council, while the Liberal Democrats had 21, Labour had 7 and there were 2 independents.

With the Conservative party needing to gain one seat to gain a majority on the council for the first time since 1986, Colchester attracted national attention with the Shadow Foreign Secretary, William Hague, coming to the marginal Shrub End ward to campaign for the Conservatives. Meanwhile, one of the Green party's Principal Speakers Siân Berry came to Colchester and campaigned on the importance of public transport, with the Greens contesting every seat at the election.

Election result
The Conservatives narrowly failed to gain a majority on the council after failing to take Wivenhoe Quay from Labour by two votes after two recounts. This meant the Conservatives remained on 30 councillors, while the Liberal Democrats stayed on 21 seats. Labour's loss of Shrub End to the Conservatives meant they dropped to 6 councillors, while the Greens failed to win any seats despite getting 32% of the vote in Castle ward. Overall turnout at the election was 34.7%.

Ward results

Berechurch

Birch & Winstree

Castle

Christ Church

Copford & West Stanway

Fordham & Stour

Great Tey

Highwoods

Mile End

New Town

Prettygate

St. Andrew's

St. Anne's

Shrub End

Stanway

Tiptree

West Bergholt & Eight Ash Green

West Mersea

Wivenhoe Cross

Wivenhoe Quay

References

2007 English local elections
2007
2000s in Essex